The UK Rock & Metal Singles Chart is a record chart which ranks the best-selling rock and heavy metal songs in the United Kingdom. Compiled and published by the Official Charts Company, the data is based on each track's weekly physical sales, digital downloads and streams. In 2006, there were 24 singles that topped the 52 published charts. The first number-one single of the year was "One Way Ticket", the lead single from One Way Ticket to Hell... and Back, the second album by The Darkness, which spent the first four weeks of the year at number one as part of a ten-week run which began in November 2005. The final number-one single of the year was "Welcome to the Black Parade", the lead single from My Chemical Romance's third album The Black Parade, which spent the last two weeks of the year atop the chart.

The most successful song on the UK Rock & Metal Singles Chart in 2006 was "Welcome to the Black Parade" by My Chemical Romance, which spent nine weeks at number one including a run of seven consecutive weeks. "Tell Me Baby" by Red Hot Chili Peppers spent five weeks at number one, while singles by The Darkness ("One Way Ticket"), Lacuna Coil ("Our Truth") and Muse ("Supermassive Black Hole" and "Starlight") all spent four weeks at number one. Four singles – "Is It Just Me?" by The Darkness, "But It's Better If You Do" by Panic! at the Disco, "Hard Rock Hallelujah" by Lordi and "Knights of Cydonia" by Muse – each spent two weeks at number one on the chart. Muse were the most successful artist on the UK Rock & Metal Singles Chart in 2006, spending a total of ten weeks at number one across three different singles.

Chart history

See also
2006 in British music
List of UK Rock & Metal Albums Chart number ones of 2006

References

External links
Official UK Rock & Metal Singles Chart Top 40 at the Official Charts Company
The Official UK Top 40 Rock Singles at BBC Radio 1

2006 in British music
United Kingdom Rock and Metal Singles
2006